Michael Scott Whittington (born August 9, 1958) is a former American football linebacker who played for the New York Giants of the National Football League (NFL). He played college football at University of Notre Dame.

References 

1958 births
Living people
Christopher Columbus High School (Miami-Dade County, Florida) alumni
Players of American football from Miami
American football linebackers
Notre Dame Fighting Irish football players
New York Giants players